Ali Doustimehr (born 23 July 1965) is an Iranian football coach. He has been the head coach of Iran national under-19 football team participating in 2009 FIFA U-17 World Cup in Nigeria and is the coach for the 2010 AFC U-19 Championship.

In 2015, Doustimehr established the KIA Football Academy alongside Mehdi Mahdavikia.

References

Iranian football managers
Living people
1965 births
Iran national under-20 football team managers